Chevaughn Junior Hugh Walsh (born 14 May 1995) is a Jamaican footballer who plays as a forward for National Premier League club Portmore United.

Career

Youth
In Jamaica Walsh played for local team Willodwale before transferring to Spanish Town Police in July 2012.

College and semi-professional
Walsh played two seasons of college soccer for the Vikings of Jefferson College in 2015 & 2016. During the two seasons, he tallied 39 goals and 20 assists in 40 matches and was named a NJCAA All-American.

For the 2016 PDL season, Walsh signed for the Ocean City Nor'easters of the Premier Development League. During the season, he scored 14 goals in 14 matches and won the league golden boot (top scorer) award. Following the season, he was named to the 2016 All-PDL team. His 14 goals set a new team record in that category as he tied the existing team record of 31 points for the season. He was then named #2 on PDL's list of top prospects behind only Christian Chaney and the winner of the PDL MVP award.

For the 2018 NPSL season, Walsh returned to his former college coach, Ricardo Garza, to play for Club Atletico Saint Louis of the National Premier Soccer League. During the season, he scored 5 goals in 6 matches and lead his team to the Heartland Conference Semi-Final. Following the season, Chevy was signed with HAGL in Vietnam.

Professional
On 19 August 2016 it was announced that Walsh had signed a 3-year deal for the Pittsburgh Riverhounds of the United Soccer League. He made his professional debut on 27 August 2016 as a substitute in a 1–1 draw with the Harrisburg City Islanders. On 3 September 2016 he made his first start for the club and scored his first professional goal as Pittsburgh defeated Orlando City B 2–0 in only his second appearance for the Riverhounds.

Honours
Individual
Premier Development League MVP (1): 2016
Premier Development League All-PDL Team (1): 2016
Premier Development League top scorer (1): 2016

References

External links
 NJCAA profile
 PDL profile
 
 Riverhounds profile
 

1995 births
Living people
Jamaican footballers
Association football forwards
Pittsburgh Riverhounds SC players
Jamaican expatriate footballers
Expatriate soccer players in the United States
USL Championship players
USL League Two players
National Premier Soccer League players
Ocean City Nor'easters players
Expatriate footballers in Vietnam
Jamaican expatriate sportspeople in Vietnam
V.League 1 players
Hoang Anh Gia Lai FC players
Thanh Hóa FC players
Expatriate footballers in Indonesia
Expatriate sportspeople in Indonesia
Liga 1 (Indonesia) players
PSIS Semarang players
Saudi Second Division players
Al-Ansar FC (Medina) players
Expatriate footballers in Saudi Arabia
People from Spanish Town